North Penn can refer to the following:

North Pennsylvania Railroad
North Penn Valley, a region in Montgomery County, Pennsylvania
North Penn School District, school district serving the North Penn Valley region
North Penn High School, high school in the North Penn School District
North Penn Water Authority, water authority in the North Penn Valley region
North Penn-Liberty High School in the Southern Tioga School District in Pennsylvania